Hugh Cecil Lowther, 5th Earl of Lonsdale,  (25 January 1857–13 April 1944) was an English peer and sportsman.

Early life

Born in 1857, he was the second son of Emily Susan, daughter of St George Francis Caulfeild of Donamon Castle of Roscommon, Ireland and Henry Lowther, 3rd Earl of Lonsdale.

In 1882, he succeeded his brother, St George Lowther, 4th Earl of Lonsdale, and was succeeded in turn by his brother, Lancelot Lowther, 6th Earl of Lonsdale upon his death in 1944.

Career
Lonsdale inherited enormous wealth derived from his father's Cumberland coalmines, and owned  of land. He had residences at Lowther Castle, at Whitehaven Castle, Barleythorpe and Carlton House Terrace, London.

He was appointed Lieutenant-Colonel in command of the Westmorland and Cumberland Yeomanry on 3 March 1897 and from February 1900 to 1901, he was Assistant Adjutant-General for the Imperial Yeomanry during the first part of the Second Boer War. He became Honorary Colonel of the Westmorland and Cumberland Yeomanry on 16 November 1908, shortly after it had transferred to the Territorial Force. During World War I his chief role was as a recruitment officer of both men and horses. He formed his own pals battalion, the Lonsdales (11th Battalion, Border Regiment). He helped found Our Dumb Friends League (now The Blue Cross) and was its chairman during the war.

Lonsdale was known as the Yellow Earl for his penchant for the colour. He was a founder and first president of the Automobile Association (AA) which adopted his livery.

In 1907, Lonsdale was part of the famous wager with John Pierpont Morgan over whether a man could circumnavigate the globe and remain unidentified.

In August 1895 the German Emperor Wilhelm II visited Lowther Castle for some grouse shooting. The kings of Italy and Portugal later came to stay, and the Kaiser a second time in 1902. The Kaiser conferred upon the Earl a knighthood of the first class of the Order of the Prussian Crown.

Although he was a Peer, he was rarely seen in the House of Lords. Because of his extravagance he was forced to sell some of his inherited properties. In 1921 Whitehaven Castle was sold, and in 1926 Barleythorpe. The same year the west Cumberland coalmines closed. In 1935 he moved from Lowther Castle because he could no longer afford to live there and moved to much smaller accommodation.

His free-spending had largely wrecked the estate, and his heir, his brother Lancelot, the 6th Earl was forced to auction off the contents of Lowther Castle in 1947. This proved to be the largest English country house sale of the 20th century.

Personal life
In 1878, before obtaining his inheritance, Lonsdale married Lady Grace Cecilie Gordon, third daughter of Maria Antoinetta Pegus (c. 1821–1893) and Charles Gordon, 10th Marquess of Huntly. Her family opposed the marriage as Lonsdale was not then wealthy and seemed irresponsible. This proved to be correct as the following year he invested in cattle in America; the venture collapsed and the Lowther family was forced to save him.

The couple then lived at Barleythorpe Hall near Oakham. Grace became pregnant but had a miscarriage after a fall while hunting. After this she was unable to bear children and remained a partial invalid for the rest of her life. She died in 1941.

After an affair with the actress Violet Cameron caused a scandal, Lonsdale set out in 1888 to explore the Arctic regions of Canada as far north as Melville Island, nearly dying before reaching Kodiak, Alaska in 1889 and returning to England. His collection of Inuit artefacts that he assembled during his explorations in Alaska and north-west Canada at this time is now in the British Museum.

Lonsdale died in 1944 at Stud House, Barleythorpe, aged 87.

Sports
Lonsdale was a founding member and first president of the National Sporting Club, and donated the original Lonsdale Belts in 1909 for the boxing championship trophy. His name was later given to the Lonsdale clothing brand of boxing garments and the Lonsdale cigar size.

He enjoyed foxhunting, serving as Master of the Quorn from 1893 to 1898 and of the Cottesmore Hunt for long periods. He was also a director of Arsenal Football Club and served as chairman for a brief period in 1936, and later became the club's honorary president.

After the First World War, Hugh gave up hunting and became more involved with race horses. He became a senior steward of the Jockey Club. He had two major wins with his colt Royal Lancer in 1922, the St Leger and the Irish St Leger. He was also the first president of the International Horse Show at Olympia.

From 1929 Lonsdale was the joint editor of the Lonsdale Library of Sports, Games and Pastimes, a book series published by Seeley, Service and Co.

In popular culture
Lonsdale was the subject of a biography by Douglas Sutherland.

References

External links

1857 births
1944 deaths
People from Cumberland
Arsenal F.C. directors and chairmen
British racehorse owners and breeders
Deputy Lieutenants of Rutland
English socialites
Founders of sporting institutions
5
Knights Grand Cross of the Royal Victorian Order
Knights of the Garter
Legion of Frontiersmen members
Lord-Lieutenants of Cumberland
Hugh
Masters of foxhounds in England
People from Westmorland
Westmorland and Cumberland Yeomanry officers